This is a list of Fresno State Bulldogs softball seasons. The Fresno State Bulldogs softball program is a college softball team that represents the California State University, Fresno in the Mountain West Conference of the National Collegiate Athletic Association.

The Bulldogs have won 24 conference regular season championships, four conference tournaments, and appeared in the NCAA Division I softball tournament 34 times, advancing to the Women's College World Series twelve times and winning the 1998 National Championship.

Season results

References

Fresno State Bulldogs softball seasons
Fresno State
Fresno State Bulldogs softball seasons